Christianity is the largest religion in Australia, though its share of total population has declined significantly over the past several decades. Section 116 of the Constitution of Australia of 1901 states, "The Commonwealth shall not make any law for establishing any religion, or for imposing any religious observance, or for prohibiting the free exercise of any religion, and no religious test shall be required as a qualification for any office or public trust under the Commonwealth."

Australia's Aboriginal peoples developed the spirituality of the Dreaming and some of the earliest evidence on earth for religious practices among humans has been found in the archaeological record of their ancestors. Torres Strait Islander religion bore similarities to broader Melanesian spirituality.

Since the start of European arrival and settlement with the British in 1788, and with subsequent immigration, Christianity has been the most widely professed faith. However, the religious landscape of Australia has been changing and diversifying in the last two decades. The 2016 Census found that Protestants outnumbered Catholics while the irreligious population was also substantial. In an optional question in the 2021 Australian National Census, 43.9% of respondents declared some variety of Christianity, with the Christian denominational distribution as follows: Catholicism 20.0%, Anglican 9.8%, Uniting Church 2.7%, Orthodox 2.1%, Presbyterian and Reformed 1.6%, Baptist 1.4%, Pentecostal 1.0%, Lutheran 0.6%, other Protestant 0.5%, and 'other Christian' 3.7%.

Other religions affiliations in 2021 were: Muslim 3.2%; Hindu 2.7%; Buddhist 2.4%; Sikh 0.8%; Jewish (0.4%); and other religions 1.7%. 38.9% declared 'No Religion', and unspecified or not declared represented a further 7.2%.

History 
Christianity came to Australia with the first British settlers on the First Fleet. Of the convicts and settlers, most were members of the established Church of England and Ireland with lesser numbers of Nonconformist Protestants, Catholics and other faiths. The first religious census in 1828 divided the early colony into four groups: Protestants, Catholics, Jews and Pagans.

Other smaller groups also arrived and established their churches. Jews started arriving in the early 19th century. The Australian gold rushes brought in workers from China and the Pacific islands, as well as specialised workers from British India, such as the mainly Muslim "Afghan Cameleers".

Australia has generally had a tradition of secular government. The Christian festivals of Easter and Christmas are public holidays.

Indigenous Australian religion 

Indigenous Australians had their own religious traditions of the Dreaming when British colonisation started in 1788. As Mircea Eliade put it, "There is a general belief among the [indigenous] Australians that the world, man, and the various animals and plants were created by certain Supernatural beings who afterwards disappeared, either ascending to the sky or entering the earth." There were and still are ritual systems, with an emphasis on life transitions such as adulthood and death.

There is evidence of contact of Indigenous Australians with explorers, fishermen, and survivors of numerous shipwrecks from peoples of various non-Indigenous cultures and faiths prior to British settlement. Indigenous Australians of (Arnhem Land) (ib Northern Australia) retain stories, songs and paintings of trade and cultural interaction with boat-people from the north. These people are generally regarded as being from the east Indonesian archipelago. There is some evidence of Islamic terms and concepts entering northern Aboriginal cultures via these interactions. (See: Macassan contact with Australia.)

Christianity 

While the Church of England originally held a position of privilege in early colonial Australia, a legal framework guaranteeing religious equality evolved within a few decades. Large numbers of Irish Catholics were transported to Australia through the British criminal justice system. British Nonconformist Methodist, Presbyterians, Congregationalists and Baptists set up their own churches in the 19th century, as did Lutherans from Germany.

Immigrants brought religious tensions, largely fuelled by historical grievances between Catholics and other Christians, that would continue into the 20th century.

The first chaplain, Richard Johnson, a Church of England cleric, was charged by Governor Arthur Phillip with improving "public morality" in the colony, and he was also heavily involved in health and education.

The gold rush of the 1850s led to significantly increased immigration and diversity of religious traditions, such as Irish Catholicism, Scottish Presbyterianism, and more English Anglicanism, among other religious traditions.

Australian Aboriginal peoples suffered a decline during this period as they were dispossessed of their lands; and diseases spread among their populations. Christian churches organised missions during this period, intended to "civilise" Aboriginal communities and spread Christianity. The overall consequences of this activity contributed to the decline of indigenous languages and beliefs, the extent to which are still being determined and recorded.

By 1901 apart from the indigenous population and the descendants of gold rush migrants, Australian society was predominantly Anglo-Celtic, with 40% of the population being Anglican, 23% Catholic, 34% other Christian and about 1% professing non-Christian religions. There was a Lutheran population of German descent in South Australia.

Freedom of Religion was enshrined in Section 116 of the Constitution of Australia of 1901 but the Church of England was not disestablished in the colony of New South Wales until the Church Act of 1836. Drafted by the reformist attorney-general John Plunkett, the act established legal equality for Anglicans, Catholics and Presbyterians and was later extended to Methodists.

Other religions

There were at least 15 Jews in the First Fleet, 14 convicts and one "free" child. 

The Tolpuddle Martyrs were sentenced to penal transportation to Australia because friendly societies had strong elements of what are now considered to be the predominant role of trade unions.

As noted above, the Australian gold rushes brought in workers from China and the Pacific islands, as well as specialised workers from British India such as, from the 1860s onwards, the mainly Muslim "Afghan Cameleers". From the 1870s Malay divers were recruited (with most subsequently repatriated). Before 1901, some Muslim sailors and prisoners came to Australia on convict ships. 

In 1901, the government passed an act limiting immigration to those of European descent in what came to be known as the White Australia Policy. By effectively limiting the immigration of practitioners of different faiths, this policy ensured that Christianity remained the religion of the overwhelming majority of Australians for the foreseeable future and, indeed, to the present day. The first census in 1911 showed 96% identified themselves as Christian. The tensions that came with the First Fleet continued into the 1960s: job vacancy advertisements sometimes included the stipulation of "Protestant preferred" or that "Catholics Need Not Apply". Nevertheless, Australia elected its first Catholic prime minister, James Scullin, in 1929 and Sir Isaac Isaacs, a Jew, was appointed governor-general in 1930.

Constitutional status
The Australian constitution consists of several documents, including the Statute of Westminster and the Australia Act of 1986, but there is only one reference to religion in the Constitution of the Commonwealth of Australia, signed into law in 1900. Notably, the constitution does not include a bill of rights and, as a result, Australia's fundamental law has been criticised for its lack of explicit protection for several rights and freedoms. However, Section 116 of the 1900 act to constitute the Commonwealth of Australia (Australian Constitution) provides that:
The Commonwealth shall not make any law for establishing any religion, or for imposing any religious observance, or for prohibiting the free exercise of any religion, and no religious test shall be required as a qualification for any office or public trust under the Commonwealth.

Technically, this article does not affect the states' authority to legislate on religion. Nor would it block federal legislation on religion, aside from that establishing an official religion of Australia. In practice, though, federal governments have respected Section 116 and generally allowed the free practice of religion. Australia does not have explicit "separation of church and state" -the essence of a secular state- in the sense that countries like the USA do. In view of Section 116 of Australia's constitution ("The Commonwealth shall not make any law for establishing any religion, or for imposing any religious observance …”) it is commonly believed that Australia is already a "secular state". This is a misconception: in 1981, the High Court determined that there is in fact no constitutional separation of church and state in Australia. However, while there is nothing in the constitution that prevents the creation of a truly secular state, there is no general 'mood' to legislative establishment of religions.

In 1983, the High Court of Australia defined religion as "a complex of beliefs and practices which point to a set of values and an understanding of the meaning of existence". The ABS 2001 Census Dictionary defines "no religion" as a category of religion which has subcategories such as agnosticism, atheism, Humanism and rationalism.

The Human Rights and Equal Opportunity Commission (HREOC) is able to inquire into allegations of discrimination on religious grounds.

In 1998 the HREOC addressed the right to freedom of religion and belief in Australia against article 18 of the International Covenant on Civil and Political Rights, stating that "despite the legal protections that apply in different jurisdictions, many Australians suffer discrimination on the basis of religious belief or non-belief, including members of both mainstream and non-mainstream religions, and those of no religious persuasion." An example of an HREOC response to such views is the IsmaU project, which examines possible prejudice against Muslims in Australia since the 11 September 2001 attacks in the US and the Bali bombings.

Demographics

A question on religion has been asked in every census taken in Australia, with the voluntary nature of this question having been specifically stated since 1933. In 1971, the instruction "if no religion, write none" was introduced. This saw a sevenfold increase from the previous census year in the percentage of Australians stating they had no religion. Since 1971, this percentage has progressively increased to 38.9% in 2021.

The Australian Bureau of Statistics (ABS) 2006 Census Dictionary statement on religious affiliation states the purpose for gathering such information:

Data on religious affiliation are used for such purposes as planning educational facilities, aged persons' care and other social services provided by religion-based organisations; the location of church buildings; the assigning of chaplains to hospitals, prisons, armed services and universities; the allocation of time on public radio and other media; and sociological research.

The census question about religion is optional, and asks "What is the person's religion?", giving respondents a choice of nine religions, "Other" and "No religion". At the 2016 census 9.6% of people declined to answer, or they did not give a response adequate for interpretation. This figure dropped to 7.2% in 2021.The religious views of those people are not known, so it is not proper to group them together with people who state that they have no religion – instead, all the census figures about religion should be treated with corresponding confidence levels.

The 2021 Australian census data showed that 43.9% of Australians classify themselves Christian, 8.2% less in real terms than just five years prior, The second-largest classification was the 38.9% who identified as "No Religion".

As in many Western countries, the level of active participation in church worship is much lower than this; weekly attendance at church services is likely to be under 1 million, about 4% of the population.

The fastest growing religious classifications over the fifteen years between 2006 and 2021 were:
 No religion – up from 18.7% to 38.9%
 Islam – up from 1.7% to 3.2%
 Hinduism – up from 0.7% to 2.7%
 Sikhism – up from 0.1% to 0.8%
 Buddhism - from 2.1% to 2.4%
Meanwhile, all Christian denominations combined decreased from 63.9% to 43.9%.

Census data 

{| class="wikitable sortable"
|+Religious declarations of Australians according to the censuses of 1986 to 2021
|-
! rowspan=2 scope="col" | Affiliation
!colspan=2| 1986
!colspan=2| 1996
!colspan=2| 2006
!colspan=2| 2011
!colspan=2| 2016
!colspan=2| 2021
|-
!  scope="col" | Count ('000)
!  scope="col" | %
!  scope="col" | Count ('000)
!  scope="col" | %
!  scope="col" | Count ('000)
!  scope="col" | %
!  scope="col" | Count ('000)
!  scope="col" | %
!  scope="col" | Count ('000)
!  scope="col" | %
!  scope="col" | Count ('000)
!  scope="col" | %
|-
| style="text-align:left; background:#E0F0FF;"| 10 Anglican
| style="text-align:right;"| 3,723.4
| style="text-align:right;"| 23.9
| style="text-align:right;"| 3,903.3
| style="text-align:right;"| 22.0
| style="text-align:right;"| 3,718.3
| style="text-align:right;"| 18.7
| style="text-align:right;"| 3,680.0
| style="text-align:right;"| 17.1
| style="text-align:right;"| 3,101.2
| style="text-align:right;"| 13.3
| style="text-align:right;"| 2,496.3
| style="text-align:right;"| 9.8
|-
| style="text-align:left; background:#E0F0FF;"| 10 Baptist
| style="text-align:right;"| 196.8
| style="text-align:right;"| 1.3
| style="text-align:right;"| 295.2
| style="text-align:right;"| 1.7
| style="text-align:right;"| 316.7
| style="text-align:right;"| 1.6
| style="text-align:right;"| 352.5
| style="text-align:right;"| 1.6
| style="text-align:right;"| 345.1
| style="text-align:right;"| 1.5
| style="text-align:right;"| 347.3
| style="text-align:right;"| 1.4
|-
| style="text-align:left; background:#E0F0FF;"| 10 Catholic Catholic
| style="text-align:right;"| 4,064.4
| style="text-align:right;"| 26.1
| style="text-align:right;"| 4,799.0
| style="text-align:right;"| 27.0
| style="text-align:right;"| 5,126.9
| style="text-align:right;"| 25.8
| style="text-align:right;"| 5,439.2
| style="text-align:right;"| 25.3
| style="text-align:right;"| 5,291.8
| style="text-align:right;"| 22.6
| style="text-align:right;"| 5,075.9
| style="text-align:right;"| 20.0
|-
| style="text-align:left; background:#E0F0FF;"| 10 Churches of Christ
| style="text-align:right;"| 88.5
| style="text-align:right;"| 0.6
| style="text-align:right;"| 75.0
| style="text-align:right;"| 0.4
| style="text-align:right;"| 54.8
| style="text-align:right;"| 0.3
| style="text-align:right;"| 49.7
| style="text-align:right;"| 0.2
| style="text-align:right;"| 39.6
| style="text-align:right;"| 0.2
| style="text-align:right;"| 35.9
| style="text-align:right;"| 0.1
|-
| style="text-align:left; background:#E0F0FF;"| 10 Jehovah's Witnesses
| style="text-align:right;"| 66.5
| style="text-align:right;"| 0.4
| style="text-align:right;"| 83.4
| style="text-align:right;"| 0.5
| style="text-align:right;"| 80.9
| style="text-align:right;"| 0.4
| style="text-align:right;"| 85.6
| style="text-align:right;"| 0.4
| style="text-align:right;"| 82.5
| style="text-align:right;"| 0.4
| style="text-align:right;"| 84.4
| style="text-align:right;"| 0.3
|-
| style="text-align:left; background:#E0F0FF;"| 10 Latter Day Saints
| style="text-align:right;"| 35.5
| style="text-align:right;"| 0.2
| style="text-align:right;"| 45.2
| style="text-align:right;"| 0.3
| style="text-align:right;"| 53.1
| style="text-align:right;"| 0.3
| style="text-align:right;"| 59.8
| style="text-align:right;"| 0.3
| style="text-align:right;"| 61.6
| style="text-align:right;"| 0.3
| style="text-align:right;"| 57.9
| style="text-align:right;"| 0.2
|-
| style="text-align:left; background:#E0F0FF;"| 10 Lutheran
| style="text-align:right;"| 208.3
| style="text-align:right;"| 1.3
| style="text-align:right;"| 250.0
| style="text-align:right;"| 1.4
| style="text-align:right;"| 251.1
| style="text-align:right;"| 1.3
| style="text-align:right;"| 251.9
| style="text-align:right;"| 1.2
| style="text-align:right;"| 174
| style="text-align:right;"| 0.7
| style="text-align:right;"| 145.9
| style="text-align:right;"| 0.6
|-
| style="text-align:left; background:#E0F0FF;"| 10 Eastern Orthodox
| style="text-align:right;"| 427.4
| style="text-align:right;"| 2.5
| style="text-align:right;"| 497.3
| style="text-align:right;"| 2.5
| style="text-align:right;"| 544.3
| style="text-align:right;"| 2.6
| style="text-align:right;"| 563.1
| style="text-align:right;"| 2.6
| style="text-align:right;"| 582.8
| style="text-align:right;"| 2.6
| style="text-align:right;"| 535.5
| style="text-align:right;"| 2.1
|-
| style="text-align:left; background:#E0F0FF;"| 10 Pentecostal
| style="text-align:right;"| 107.0
| style="text-align:right;"| 0.7
| style="text-align:right;"| 174.6
| style="text-align:right;"| 1.0
| style="text-align:right;"| 219.6
| style="text-align:right;"| 1.1
| style="text-align:right;"| 238.0
| style="text-align:right;"| 1.1
| style="text-align:right;"| 260.6
| style="text-align:right;"| 1.1
| style="text-align:right;"| 259.8
| style="text-align:right;"| 1.1
|-
| style="text-align:left; background:#E0F0FF;"| 10 Presbyterian & Reformed
| style="text-align:right;"| 560.0
| style="text-align:right;"| 3.6
| style="text-align:right;"| 675.5
| style="text-align:right;"| 3.8
| style="text-align:right;"| 596.7
| style="text-align:right;"| 3.0
| style="text-align:right;"| 599.5
| style="text-align:right;"| 2.8
| style="text-align:right;"| 526.7
| style="text-align:right;"| 2.3
| style="text-align:right;"| 414.9
| style="text-align:right;"| 1.6
|-
| style="text-align:left; background:#E0F0FF;"| 10 Salvation Army
| style="text-align:right;"| 77.8
| style="text-align:right;"| 0.5
| style="text-align:right;"| 74.1
| style="text-align:right;"| 0.4
| style="text-align:right;"| 64.2
| style="text-align:right;"| 0.3
| style="text-align:right;"| 60.2
| style="text-align:right;"| 0.3
| style="text-align:right;"| 48.9
| style="text-align:right;"| 0.2
| style="text-align:right;"| 35.4
| style="text-align:right;"| 0.1
|-
| style="text-align:left; background:#E0F0FF;"| 10 Seventh-day Adventist
| style="text-align:right;"| 48.0
| style="text-align:right;"| 0.3
| style="text-align:right;"| 52.7
| style="text-align:right;"| 0.3
| style="text-align:right;"| 55.3
| style="text-align:right;"| 0.3
| style="text-align:right;"| 63.0
| style="text-align:right;"| 0.3
| style="text-align:right;"| 62.9
| style="text-align:right;"| 0.3
| style="text-align:right;"| 63.7
| style="text-align:right;"| 0.3
|-
| style="text-align:left; background:#E0F0FF;"| 10 Uniting Church
| style="text-align:right;"| 1,182.3
| style="text-align:right;"| 7.6
| style="text-align:right;"| 1,334.9
| style="text-align:right;"| 7.5
| style="text-align:right;"| 1,135.4
| style="text-align:right;"| 5.7
| style="text-align:right;"| 1,065.8
| style="text-align:right;"| 5.0
| style="text-align:right;"| 870.2
| style="text-align:right;"| 3.7
| style="text-align:right;"| 673.3
| style="text-align:right;"| 2.7
|-
| style="text-align:left; background:#E0F0FF;"| 12 Other Christian
| style="text-align:right;"| 596.0
| style="text-align:right;"| 3.8
| style="text-align:right;"| 322.7
| style="text-align:right;"| 1.8
| style="text-align:right;"| 468.6
| style="text-align:right;"| 2.4
| style="text-align:right;"| 642.4
| style="text-align:right;"| 3.0
| style="text-align:right;"| 833.5
| style="text-align:right;"| 3.6
| style="text-align:right;"| 926.8
| style="text-align:right;"| 3.7
|-
| style="text-align:left; background:#E0F0FF;"| 15 Christian total
| style="text-align:right;"| 11,381.9
| style="text-align:right;"| 73.0
| style="text-align:right;"| 12,582.9
| style="text-align:right;"| 70.9
| style="text-align:right;"| 12,685.9
| style="text-align:right;"| 63.9
| style="text-align:right;"| 13,150.6
| style="text-align:right;"| 61.1
| style="text-align:right;"| 12,201.6
| style="text-align:right;"| 52.1
| style="text-align:right;"| 11,148.8
| style="text-align:right;"| 43.9
|-
| style="text-align:left; background:#FFFFC0;"| 20 Buddhism
| style="text-align:right;"| 80.4
| style="text-align:right;"| 0.5
| style="text-align:right;"| 199.8
| style="text-align:right;"| 1.1
| style="text-align:right;"| 418.8
| style="text-align:right;"| 2.1
| style="text-align:right;"| 529.0
| style="text-align:right;"| 2.5
| style="text-align:right;"| 563.7
| style="text-align:right;"| 2.4
| style="text-align:right;"| 615.8
| style="text-align:right;"| 2.4
|-
| style="text-align:left; background:#FFE0C0;"| 20 Hinduism
| style="text-align:right;"| 21.5
| style="text-align:right;"| 0.1
| style="text-align:right;"| 67.3
| style="text-align:right;"| 0.4
| style="text-align:right;"| 148.1
| style="text-align:right;"| 0.7
| style="text-align:right;"| 275.5
| style="text-align:right;"| 1.3
| style="text-align:right;"| 440.3
| style="text-align:right;"| 1.9
| style="text-align:right;"| 684.0
| style="text-align:right;"| 2.7
|-
| style="text-align:left; background:#F0F0C0;"| 20 Sikhism
| style="text-align:right;"| 
| style="text-align:right;"| 
| style="text-align:right;"| 12.0
| style="text-align:right;"| <0.1
| style="text-align:right;"| 26.4
| style="text-align:right;"| 0.1
| style="text-align:right;"| 72.3
| style="text-align:right;"| 0.4
| style="text-align:right;"| 125.9
| style="text-align:right;"| 0.5
| style="text-align:right;"| 210.4
| style="text-align:right;"| 0.8
|-
| style="text-align:left; background:#E0FFD0;"| 20 Islam
| style="text-align:right;"| 109.5
| style="text-align:right;"| 0.7
| style="text-align:right;"| 200.9
| style="text-align:right;"| 1.1
| style="text-align:right;"| 340.4
| style="text-align:right;"| 1.7
| style="text-align:right;"| 476.3
| style="text-align:right;"| 2.2
| style="text-align:right;"| 604.2
| style="text-align:right;"| 2.6
| style="text-align:right;"| 813.4
| style="text-align:right;"| 3.2
|-
| style="text-align:left; background:#E0E0FF;"| 20 Judaism
| style="text-align:right;"| 69.1
| style="text-align:right;"| 0.4
| style="text-align:right;"| 79.8
| style="text-align:right;"| 0.4
| style="text-align:right;"| 88.8
| style="text-align:right;"| 0.4
| style="text-align:right;"| 97.3
| style="text-align:right;"| 0.5
| style="text-align:right;"| 91
| style="text-align:right;"| 0.4
| style="text-align:right;"| 100.0
| style="text-align:right;"| 0.4
|-
| style="text-align:left; background:#F0E0F0;"| 20 Other non-Christian
| style="text-align:right;"| 35.7
| style="text-align:right;"| 0.2
| style="text-align:right;"| 56.6
| style="text-align:right;"| 0.3
| style="text-align:right;"| 82.6
| style="text-align:right;"| 0.4
| style="text-align:right;"| 95.9
| style="text-align:right;"| 0.4
| style="text-align:right;"| 95.7
| style="text-align:right;"| 0.4
| style="text-align:right;"| 115.0
| style="text-align:right;"| 0.5
|-
| style="text-align:left; background:#DCDCDC;"| 25 Non-Christian total
| style="text-align:right;"| 316.2
| style="text-align:right;"| 2.0
| style="text-align:right;"| 616.4
| style="text-align:right;"| 3.5
| style="text-align:right;"| 1,105.1
| style="text-align:right;"| 5.6
| style="text-align:right;"| 1,546.3
| style="text-align:right;"| 7.2
| style="text-align:right;"| 1,920.8
| style="text-align:right;"| 8.2| style="text-align:right;"| 2,538.6| style="text-align:right;"| 10.0|-
| style="text-align:left; | 30 No Religion1| style="text-align:right;"| 1,977.5| style="text-align:right;"| 12.7| style="text-align:right;"| 2,948.9| style="text-align:right;"| 16.6| style="text-align:right;"| 3,706.5| style="text-align:right;"| 18.7| style="text-align:right;"| 4,796.8| style="text-align:right;"| 22.3| style="text-align:right;"| 7,040.7| style="text-align:right;"| 30.1| style="text-align:right;"| 9,887.0| style="text-align:right;"| 38.9|-
| style="text-align:left; | 40 Not Stated2| style="text-align:right;"| 1,926.6
| style="text-align:right;"| 12.3
| style="text-align:right;"| 1,604.8
| style="text-align:right;"| 9.0
| style="text-align:right;"| 2,357.8
| style="text-align:right;"| 11.9
| style="text-align:right;"| 2,014.0
| style="text-align:right;"| 9.4
| style="text-align:right;"| 2,345.5
| style="text-align:right;"| 10
| style="text-align:right;"| 1,751.4
| style="text-align:right;"| 7.3
|- class="sortbottom"
| style="text-align:left;"|Totals3| style="text-align:right;"| 15,602.1| style="text-align:right;"| 100.0| style="text-align:right;"| 17,753.0| style="text-align:right;"| 100.0| style="text-align:right;"| 19,855.3| style="text-align:right;"| 100.0| style="text-align:right;"| 21,507.7| style="text-align:right;"| 100.0| style="text-align:right;"| 23,401.4| style="text-align:right;"| 100.0| style="text-align:right;"| 25,422.8| style="text-align:right;"| 100.0'''
|}
1: Includes relatively small numbers of so-called 'Secular Beliefs' such as Atheism, Agnosticism, Humanism &, Rationalism, and Other Spiritual Beliefs such as New Age, Own Spiritual Beliefs, Theism(!), etc. See 7

2: Includes 'Inadequately described'

3: Due to rounding, figures may not add up to the totals shown.

 Line and bar charts 

 Total Fertility Rates (TFR) 
As of 2016, Buddhists (1.68), Hindus (1.81) and Irreligion (1.84) had the lowest fertility rate. Christians (2.11) and Jews (2.17) had a moderate TFR, and Muslims had the highest fertility rate at 3.03.

 Indigenous Australian traditions 

Prior to British colonisation in Australia, the animist beliefs of Indigenous Australian peoples had been practised for millennia. In the case of mainland Aboriginal Australians, their spirituality is known as the Dreaming and it places a heavy emphasis on belonging to the land. The collection of stories which it contains shaped Aboriginal law and customs. Aboriginal art, story and dance continue to draw on these spiritual traditions. In the case of the Torres Strait Islanders who inhabit the islands between Australia and New Guinea, spirituality and customs reflected their Melanesian origins and dependence on the sea.

Indigenous Australians have a complex oral tradition and spiritual values based upon reverence for the land and a belief in the Dreaming. The Dreaming is at once the ancient time of creation and the present day reality of Dreaming. There were a great many different groups, each with their own individual culture, belief structure, and language. These cultures overlapped to a greater or lesser extent, and evolved over time. The Rainbow Serpent is a major dream spirit for Aboriginal people across Australia. The Yowie and Bunyip are other well known dream spirits. At the time of the British settlement, traditional religions were animist and also tended to have elements of ancestor worship.

According to the 2001 census, 5,244 persons or less than 0.03 percent of respondents reported practising Aboriginal traditional religions. Aboriginal beliefs and spirituality, even among those Aboriginal peoples who identify themselves as members of a traditional organised religion, are intrinsically linked to the land generally and to certain sites of significance in particular. The 1996 census reported that almost 72 percent of Aboriginal peoples practised some form of Christianity and 16 percent listed no religion. The 2001 census contained no comparable updated data.

 Since British settlement 

European culture and Christianity have had a significant impact on Indigenous Australians. As in many colonial situations the churches both facilitated the loss of Indigenous Australian culture and religion and also facilitated its maintenance. The involvement of Christians in Aboriginal affairs has evolved significantly since 1788. Around the year 2000, many churches and church organisations officially apologised for past failures to adequately respect indigenous cultures and address the injustices of the dispossession of indigenous people.

In the Torres Strait Islands, the Coming of the Light Festival marks the day the Christian missionaries first arrived on the islands on 1 July 1871 and introduced Christianity to the region. This is a significant festival for Torres Strait Islanders, who are predominantly Christian. Religious and cultural ceremonies are held across Torres Strait and mainland Australia.

Prominent Aboriginal activist Noel Pearson, himself raised at a Lutheran mission in Cape York, has written that missions throughout Australia's colonial history "provided a haven from the hell of life on the Australian frontier while at the same time facilitating colonisation". Prominent Aboriginal Christians have included Pastor David Unaipon, the first Aboriginal author; Pastor Sir Douglas Nicholls, athlete, activist and former Governor of South Australia; Mum (Shirl) Smith, a celebrated Redfern community worker who, assisted by the Sisters of Charity, work to assist Aboriginal peoples.; and former Senator Aden Ridgeway, the first Chairman of the Aboriginal Catholic Ministry. In recent times, Christians such as Fr Ted Kennedy of Redfern, Jesuit human rights lawyer Fr Frank Brennan and the Josephite Sisters have been prominent in working for Aboriginal rights and improvements to standards of living.

 Abrahamic religions 
 Christianity 

After the arrival of the first Christian settlers on the First Fleet of British ships in 1788, Christianity quickly became the major religion in Australia. Consequently, the Christian festivals of Christmas and Easter are public holidays, the skylines of Australian cities and towns are marked by church and cathedral spires. Christian churches played a significant role in the development of early education, health and welfare services in Australia.

The churches with the largest number of members are the Catholic Church, the Anglican Church of Australia and the Uniting Church in Australia. The National Council of Churches in Australia has been the main Christian ecumenical body.

For much of Australian history, the Church of England in Australia, now known as the Anglican Church of Australia, was the largest religious affiliation. However its relative position has declined, with the Catholic Church, benefiting from post-war Australia multicultural immigration, among other factors, to become the largest single religious group. The Greek Orthodox Archdiocese of Australia and other congregations associated with non-British cultures have also expanded.

Today, the Catholic education system is the second biggest sector after government schools, with more than 750,000 students in 2018 (and around 21 per cent of all secondary school enrolments). The Anglican Church educates around 105,000 students and the Uniting Church has around 48 schools. Smaller denominations, including the Lutheran Church also have a number of schools in Australia. The Greek Orthodox Archdiocese of Australia also has 8 schools across the country. There are two Catholic universities in Australia: the Australian Catholic University which opened in 1991 following the amalgamation of four Catholic tertiary institutions in eastern Australia, and the University of Notre Dame Australia based in Perth.

Catholic Social Services Australia's 63 member organisations help more than a million Australians every year. Anglican organisations work in health, missionary work, social welfare and communications; and the Uniting Church does extensive community work, in aged care, hospitals, nursing, family support services, youth services and with the homeless, and especially throughout inland Australia. Christian charities such as the Saint Vincent de Paul Society, the Salvation Army, Anglicare, and Youth Off the Streets receive considerable national support. Religious orders founded many of Australia's hospitals, such as St Vincent's Hospital, Sydney, which was opened as a free hospital in 1857 by the Sisters of Charity and is now Australia's largest not-for-profit health provider and has trained prominent Australian surgeons such as Victor Chang.

Notable Australian Christians have included: Mary MacKillop – educator, founder of the Sisters of St Joseph of the Sacred Heart and the first Australian to be recognised as a saint by the Catholic Church; David Unaipon – an Aboriginal writer, inventor and Christian preacher currently featured on the Australian $50 note; Archbishop Daniel Mannix of Melbourne – a controversial voice against Conscription during World War I and against British policy in Ireland; the Reverend John Flynn – founder of the Royal Flying Doctor Service, currently featured on the Australian $20 note; Sir Douglas Nicholls – Aboriginal rights activist, athlete, pastor and former Governor of South Australia; Archbishop Stylianos Harkianakis – Archbishop and primate of the Greek Orthodox church in Australia from 1975 to 2019

Sectarianism in Australia tended to reflect the political inheritance of Britain and Ireland. Until 1945, the vast majority of Catholics in Australia were of Irish descent, causing the British majority to question their loyalty to the British Empire. The first Catholic priests arrived in Australia as convicts in 1800, but the Castle Hill Rebellion of 1804 alarmed the British authorities and no further priests were allowed in the colony until 1820, when London sent John Joseph Therry and Philip Connolly. In 1901, the Australian Constitution guaranteed Separation of Church and State. A notable period of sectarianism re-emerged during the First World War and the 1916 Easter Uprising in Ireland, but sectarian division declined after World War II. There was a diversification of Christian churches (especially with the growth of Greek, Macedonian, Serbian and Russian Orthodox churches), together with an increase in ecumenism among Christians through organisations such as the National Council of Churches in Australia, as well as an increase in non-religious adherence.

One of the most visible signs of the historical importance of Christianity to Australia is the prominence of churches in most Australian towns and cities. Among Australia's oldest are Ebenezer Chapel and the Anglican St Matthew's, Windsor, St Luke's, Liverpool, St Peter's, Campbelltown and St James Church, Sydney, built between 1819 and 1824 by Governor Macquarie's architect, Francis Greenway. St Mary's Cathedral, Sydney, was built to a design by William Wardell from a foundation stone laid in 1868; the spires of the cathedral were not finally added until the year 2000. Wardell also worked on the design of St Patrick's Cathedral, Melbourne – among the finest examples of ecclesiastical architecture in Australia. The Anglican St Paul's Cathedral, Melbourne, in the iconic hub of the city opposite Flinders Street station. Adelaide is known as the "City of Churches", but churches extend far into the Australian Outback, as at the historic Lutheran Mission Chapel at Hermannsburg, Northern Territory. Along with community attitudes to religion, church architecture changed significantly during the 20th century. Urban churches, such as the Wayside Chapel (1964) in Sydney, differed markedly from traditional ecclesiastical designs. In the later 20th century, distinctly Australian approaches were applied at places such as Jambaroo Benedictine Abbey, where natural materials were chosen to "harmonise with the local environment" and the chapel sanctuary is of glass overlooking rainforest. Similar design principles were applied at Thredbo Ecumenical Chapel built in the Snowy Mountains in 1996.

The Christian festivals of Christmas and Easter are national public holidays in Australia. Christmas, which recalls the birth of Jesus Christ, is celebrated on 25 December during the Australian summer (although on 7 January by some Eastern Orthodox) and is an important cultural festival even for many non-religious Australians. The European traditions of Christmas trees, roast dinners, carols and gift giving are all continued in Australia, but they might be conducted between visits to the beach.

Here are some Christian denominations with Australian articles:
 Anglican Church of Australia (formerly the Church of England in Australia)
 Antiochian Orthodox Archdiocese of Australia
 Australian Christian Churches (formerly the Assemblies of God in Australia)
 Australian Union Conference of Seventh-day Adventists
 Baptist Union of Australia
 Christian City Churches, started in Australia
 Churches of Christ in Australia
 The Church of Jesus Christ of Latter-day Saints in Australia
 Fellowship of Congregational Churches, Australian only
 Greek Orthodox Archdiocese of Australia
 CRC Churches International
 Lutheran Church of Australia
 Presbyterian Church of Australia
 Presbyterian Church of Eastern Australia
 Presbyterian Reformed Church (Australia)
 Catholic Church in Australia
 Uniting Church in Australia
 Two by Twos

 Islam 

The first contacts that Islam had with Australia was when Muslim fishermen native to Makassar, which is today a part of Indonesia, visited North-Western Australia long before British settlement in 1788. This contact of South East Asian ethnic groups of Islamic faith can be identified from the graves they dug for their comrades who died on the journey, being that they face Mecca (in Arabia), in accordance with Islamic regulations concerning burial, as well as evidence from Aboriginal cave paintings and religious ceremonies which depict and incorporate the adoption of Makassan canoe designs and words.Hussein Abdulwahid Ameen, 'Muslims in Our Near North', http://www.islamfortoday.com/australia03.htm#nearnorth, (viewed) 7 May 2008

In later history, throughout the 19th century following British settlement, other Muslims came to Australia including the Muslim 'Afghan' cameleers, who used their camels to transport goods and people through the otherwise unnavigable desert and pioneered a network of camel tracks that later became roads across the Outback. Australia's first mosque was built for them at Marree, South Australia in 1861. Between the 1860s and 1920s around 2000 cameleers were brought from Afghanistan and the north west of British India (now Pakistan) and perhaps 100 families remained in Australia. Other outback mosques were established at places like Coolgardie, Cloncurry, and Broken Hill – and more permanent mosques in Adelaide, Perth and later Brisbane. A legacy of this pioneer era is the presence of wild camels in Outback and the oldest Islamic structure in the southern hemisphere, at Central Adelaide Mosque. Nonetheless, despite their significant role in Australia prior to the establishment of rail and road networks, the formulation of the White Australia policy at the time of Federation made immigration difficult for the 'Afghans' and their memory slowly faded during the 20th century, until a revival of interest began in the 1980s.

Successive Australian governments dismantled the White Australia Policy in the Post-WW2 period. From the 1970s onwards, under the leadership of Gough Whitlam and Malcolm Fraser, Australia began to pursue multiculturalism. Australia in the later 20th century became a refuge for many Muslims fleeing conflicts including those in Lebanon, Bosnia, Iraq, Iran, Sudan and Afghanistan. General immigration, combined with religious conversion to Islam by Christians and other Australians, as well as Australia's participation in UN refugee efforts has increased the overall Muslim population. Around 36% of Muslims are Australian born. Overseas born Muslims come from a great variety of nations and ethnic groups – with large Lebanese and Turkish communities.

Following the 11 September attacks, associations drawn between the political ideology of Osama Bin Laden and the religion of Islam have stirred debate in some quarters in Australia regarding Islam's relationship with the wider community – with some advocating greater emphasis on assimilation, and others supporting renewed commitment to diversity. The deaths of Australians in bombings by militant Islamic fundamentalists in New York in 2001, Bali in 2002–5 and London in 2005; as well as the sending of Australian troops to East Timor in 1999, Afghanistan in 2001 and Iraq in 2003; the arrest of bomb plotters in Australia; and concerns about certain cultural practices such as the wearing of the Burkha have all contributed to a degree of tension in recent times A series of comments by a senior Sydney cleric, Sheikh Taj El-Din Hilaly also stirred controversy, particularly his remarks regarding "female modesty" following an incident of gang rape in Sydney Australians were among the targets of Islamic Fundamentalists in the Bali bombings in Indonesia and attack on Australian Embassy in Jakarta and the South East Asian militant group Jemaah Islamiyah has been of particular concern to Australians.

The Australian government's mandatory detention processing system for asylum seekers became increasingly controversial after the 11 September attacks. A significant proportion of recent Asylum seekers arriving by boat have been Muslims fleeing the conflicts in Iraq and Afghanistan and elsewhere. Some Islamic leaders and social commentators claim that Islam has suffered from unfair stereotyping Violence and intimidation was directed against Muslims and people of Middle Eastern appearance during southern Sydney's Cronulla riots in 2005.
In 2005, the Howard Government established the Muslim Community Reference Group to advise on Muslim community issues for one year, chaired by Ameer Ali. Inter-faith dialogues were also established by Christian and Muslim groups such as The Australian Federation of Islamic Councils and the National Council of Churches in Australia. Australia and Indonesia co-operated closely following the Bali-bombings, not only in law-enforcement but in improving education and cross-cultural understanding, leading to a marked improvement in relations. After a series of controversies, Sheikh Taj El-Din Hilaly retired as Grand mufti of Australia in 2007 and was replaced by Fehmi Naji El-Imam AM.

Today, over 604,000 people in Australia identify as Muslim, with diverse communities concentrated mainly in Sydney and Melbourne. More than half are non-practising cultural Muslims. Since the 1970s Islamic schools have been established as well as more than 100 mosques and prayer centres. Many notable Muslim places of worship are to be found in large Australian cities, including the Central Adelaide Mosque, which was constructed during the 1880s; and Sydney's Classical Ottoman style Auburn Gallipoli Mosque, which was largely funded by the Turkish community and the name of which recalls the shared heritage of the foundation of modern Turkey and the story of the ANZACs. 1,140 people identified as Aboriginal Muslims in the 2011 census, almost double the number recorded in the 2001 census. Notable Australian Muslims include boxer Anthony Mundine; community worker and rugby league star Hazem El Masri; cricketer Usman Khawaja and academic Waleed Aly. In 2013, Labor MP Ed Husic became Australia's first Muslim member of Cabinet, briefly serving as Parliamentary Secretary to the Prime Minister and for Broadband in the short lived Second Rudd Government.

 Judaism 

At least eight Jewish convicts are believed to have been transported to Sydney aboard the First Fleet in 1788, when the first British settlement was established on the continent. An estimated 110,000 Jews currently live in Australia, the majority being Ashkenazi Jews of Eastern European descent, with many being refugees and Holocaust survivors who arrived during and after World War II.

The Jewish population has increased slightly in recent times due to immigration from South Africa and the former Soviet Union. The largest Jewish community in Australia is in Melbourne, with about 60,000, followed by Sydney with about 45,000 members. Smaller communities are dispersed among the other state capitals.

Following the conclusion of the British colonial period, Jews have enjoyed formal equality before the law in Australia and have not been subject to civil disabilities or other forms of state-sponsored anti-Semitism which exclude them from full participation in public life.

Sydney's gothic design Great Synagogue, consecrated in 1878, is a notable place of Jewish worship in Australia. Notable Australian Jews have included the Sir John Monash, the notable World War I general who opened the Maccabean Hall in Sydney in 1923 to commemorate Jews who fought and died in the First World War and who is currently featured on the Australian $100 note; and Sir Isaac Isaacs who became the first Australian born governor general in 1930. Sir Zelman Cowen also served as Governor-General, between 1977 and 1982. The Sydney Jewish Museum opened in 1992 to commemorate The Holocaust "challenge visitors' perceptions of democracy, morality, social justice and human rights".

Until the 1930s, all synagogues in Australia were nominally Orthodox, with most acknowledging leadership of the Chief Rabbi of the United Kingdom. To this day the vast majority of synagogues in Australia are Orthodox. However, there is a wide range of Orthodox congregations, including Mizrachi, Chabad and Adass Israel congregations. There are also Sephardi congregations.

There had been short-lived efforts to establish Reform congregations as early as the 1890s. However, under the leadership of Ada Phillips, a sustained liberal congregation, Temple Beth Israel, was established in Melbourne. Subsequently, another synagogue linked to the United States Reform Movement, Temple Emanuel, was established in Sydney. Following these two congregations, a number of other Liberal synagogues have been founded in other cities.

Since 1992 Conservative (Masorti) services have been held as an alternative service usually in the Neuweg, the smaller second synagogue within Temple Emanuel, Woollahra, Sydney. In 1999, Kehilat Nitzan, Melbourne's first Conservative (Masorti) congregation was established, with foundation president John Rosenberg. The congregation appointed its first rabbi, Ehud Bandel in 2006. In 2010 Beit Knesset Shalom became Brisbane's first Conservative (Masorti) synagogue.

In 2012, the first humanistic Jewish congregation, known as Kehilat Kolenu, was established in Melbourne with links to the cultural Jewish youth movement Habonim Dror. Later in 2012, a similar congregation was established in Sydney, known as Ayelet HaShachar. The services are loosely based on the Humanistic Jewish movement in the United States and the musical-prayer group Nava Tehila in Israel.

 Baháʼí Faith 

The Baháʼí Faith first arrived in Australia in 1922, and at less than 0.1% of the total population, is one of the smaller religious minorities. The Sydney Baháʼí Temple is situated in Ingleside, a northern suburb of Sydney. According to Jennifer Taylor, a historian at Sydney University, it is among Sydney's four most significant religious buildings constructed in the twentieth century. Dedicated in 1961, it was also the world's fourth Baháʼí House of Worship to be completed.
 
The 1996 Australian Census lists Baháʼí membership at just under 9,000. In 2001, the second edition of A Practical Reference to Religious Diversity for Operational Police and Emergency Services added the Baháʼí Faith to its coverage of religions in Australia and noted that the community had grown to over 11,000. The Association of Religion Data Archives (relying on World Christian Encyclopedia) estimated some 17,700 Baháʼís in 2005, and over 19,300 in 2010. However, census data from 2016 reported a much lower population of only 13,988.

 Indian/Dharmic religions 
 Hinduism 

Hindus numbered 684,000 in the 2021 census, making Hinduism the fourth largest religious or non-religious affiliation one of the fastest growing religions in Australia (12.0% per year since 2011). In the 19th century, Hindus first came to Australia to work on cotton and sugar plantations. Many who remained worked in small business, as camel drivers, merchants and hawkers, selling goods between small rural communities. Their population increased dramatically from the 1960s and 1970s and more than doubled between the 1996 and 2006 census to around 148,000 people. Most were migrants from countries such as Fiji, India, Sri Lanka, Malaysia, Singapore and South Africa. At present many Hindus are well-educated professionals in fields such as medicine, engineering, commerce and information technology. Among Australia's best-known Hindus is the singer Kamahl. There are around forty-three Hindu temples in Australia, the Sri Mandir Temple in Auburn, Sydney being the first established in 1977.

 Buddhism 

Buddhists began arriving in Australia in significant numbers during the goldrush of the 1850s with an influx of Chinese miners. However, the population remained low until the 1960s. Buddhism is now one of the fastest growing religions in Australia. Immigration from Asia has contributed to this, but some people of non-Asian origin have also converted. The three main traditions of Buddhism—Theravada, East Asian and Tibetan—are now represented in Australia. According to the 2021 census, Buddhism has 615,800 adherents: 2.4% of the total population.

Buddhist temples can be very active. Quang Minh Temple in Braybrook, Melbourne, Victoria gets about 2,000 people through every Sunday and gives a free vegetarian meal to about 600 people. For important events, more than 20,000 people come. Even more come to the Nan Tien Temple, or "Southern Paradise Temple", in Wollongong, New South Wales, began construction in the early 1990s, adopting the Chinese palace building style and is now the largest Buddhist temple in the Southern Hemisphere. This temple follows the Venerable Master Hsing Yun of the Fo Guang Shan Buddhist order. Bodhinyana Monastery is a Theravadin Buddhist monastery in the Thai Forest Tradition located in Serpentine, Western Australia.

 Sikhism 

Sikhism has been one of the fastest growing religions in Australia in recent years. According to census data, Australia's Sikh population grew from 72,000 to 210,400 between 2011 and 2021, an average growth rate of 14.8% per year. Around 42% of Australia's Sikhs live in the state of Victoria.

 Jainism 

Jainism is currently the fourth fastest growing religion in Australia, recording 4,050 adherents in 2016 and growing an average of 7.7% per year. The overwhelming majority (94.7%) of Jains live inside the state capitals, primarily Sydney, Melbourne and Perth.

 Irreligion 

Non-religious 
Australia is one of the least religious nations in the developed world, with religion not described as a central part in many people's lives. This view is prominent among Australia's youth, who were ranked as the least religious worldwide in a 2008 survey conducted by The Christian Science Monitor. In the 2021 census, the ABS categorised ~9,887,000 Australians (38.9%) as having no religion, up 16.6% in real terms from 4,796,800 (22.3%) in 2011. This category includes agnosticism, atheism, humanism, rationalism, and people who are unaffiliated with any particular religion.

 Atheism 
While people with no religion are more than 30% of the Australian population, the Australian Bureau of Statistics does not provide information in the annual "1301.0 – Year Book Australia" on religious affiliation as to how many people fall into each sub-category. Data on religious affiliation is only collected by the ABS at the five yearly population census. Atheist interests in Australia are represented nationally by the Atheist Foundation of Australia. Humanist interests in Australia are represented nationally by the Council of Australian Humanist Societies. Rationalist interests in Australia are represented nationally by the Rationalist Society of Australia. The Global Atheist Convention, a prominent atheist event, has been held in Melbourne.

 Other religions 
The 2006 census shows 53 listed groups down to 5000 members, most of them Christian denominations, many of them national versions such as Greek, Serbian Orthodox and Assyrian Orthodox. Of the smaller religions, Pagan religions 29,328, the Baháʼí Faith at 12,000, Humanism about 7000. Between 1000 and 5000, are the following religions—Taoism, Druse, Satanism, Zoroastrian, Rationalism, Creativity, Theosophy, Jainism. There are also adherents of Tenrikyo, Shinto, Unitarian Universalism, Eckankar, Cao Dai, Rastafari, Pantheism, Scientology and Raelianism.

In general, non-Christian religions and those with no religion have been growing in proportion to the overall population. With fewer classifications, data from 1996 and 2001 showed Aboriginal religion decreasing from 7000 to 5000 while Baháʼí grew from just under 9,000 to over 11,000 and the rest of the "Other" category growing from about 69,000 to about 92,000.

 Paganism 

Alexandrian Wiccans and Gardnerian Wiccans arrived in Australia from England and the United States around the late 1960s.

In the 2011 census, 32,083 Australians identified their religion as a Pagan religion including 8,413 people who identified their religion as Wicca or Witchcraft.

 Interfaith efforts 
Interfaith efforts between various religious institutions occur. Since the early 2000s, the Abraham Conference convenes as an annual interfaith event between Christians, Muslims, and Jews.

 See also 

Stolen Generations
Freedom of religion in AustraliaA Practical Reference to Religious Diversity for Operational Police and Emergency Services Australian Association for Jewish Studies
 Broken Rites & Catholic Church sexual abuse cases in Australia
 Sexual abuse by yoga gurus
 Royal Commission into Institutional Responses to Child Sexual Abuse

 Notes 

 References 

 Further reading 

Berndt, R. M. Australian Aboriginal Religion, E. J. Brill, Leiden, 1974 
Bouma, Gary, ed. Many Religions All Australian: Religious Settlement, Identity and Cultural Diversity. Melbourne: Christian Research Association, 1997. 
Carey, Hilary M. Believing in Australia. Sydney: Allen & Unwin, 1992. 
Eliade, M., Australian Religions: An Introduction, Oxford University Press, London, 1973 
 Hilliard, David. "Popular Religion in Australia in the 1950s: A Study of Adelaide and Brisbane." Journal of religious history 15.2 (1988): 219–235.
 Hilliard, David. "The religious crisis of the 1960s: the experience of the Australian churches." Journal of religious history 21.2 (1997): 209–227.
 Humphreys, Robert, and Rowland S. Ward. Religious bodies in Australia: a comprehensive guide (New Melbourne Press, 1995).
 Hunt, A. D. "For God, King, and country": A study of the attitudes of the Methodist and Catholic press in South Australia (1979) 
Jupp, James, ed. The Encyclopedia of Religion in Australia, Melbourne: Cambridge University Press, 2009. 
Lovat, Terence. New Studies in Religion. Social Science Press pg 148 (2002)
 O'Brien, Anne. God's Willing Workers: Women and Religion in Australia (University of New South Wales Press, 2005)
 O'Brien, Anne. "Historical overview spirituality and work Sydney women, 1920–1960." Australian Historical Studies 33.120 (2002): 373–388.
 Thompson, Roger C. Religion in Australia: A history (Melbourne: Oxford University Press, 1994), a standard scholarly survey

 Anglicans 
 B. Kaye, ed., Anglicanism in Australia: a History (Melbourne: Melbourne University Press, 2002)
 T. Frame, A Church for the Nation: a History of the Anglican Diocese of Canberra and Goulburn (Sydney: Hale & Iremonger, 2000). 
 D. Hilliard, Godliness and Good Order: A History of the Anglican Church in South Australia (Adelaide: Wakefield Press, 1986)
 S. Judd and K. J. Cable, Sydney Anglicans: A History of the Diocese (Sydney: Anglican Information Office, 1987)
 B. Porter, ed.,  Melbourne Anglicans: The Diocese of Melbourne 1847–1978 (Melbourne: Mitre Books, 1997)

 Catholics 
 Campion, Edmund. Rockchoppers: Growing Up Catholic in Australia (1983) 
 Dixon, Robert E. The Catholics in Australia (1996) 
 Hamilton, Celia. "Irish-Catholics of New South Wales and the Labor Party, 1890–1910," Historical Studies: Australia & New Zealand (1958) 8(31): 254–267
 Laffin, Josephine. "'Sailing in Stormy Waters': Archbishop Matthew Beovich and the Catholic Archdiocese of Adelaide in the 1960s." Journal of Religious History 34.3 (2010): 289–311.
 McGrath, Sophie. "Women Religious in the History of Australia 1888–1950: a Case Study – the Sisters of Mercy Parramatta," Journal of the Royal Australian Historical Society (1995) 81(2): 195–212
 Murtagh, James G. Australia: The Catholic Chapter (1959) 
 O'Donoghue, Thomas A. Upholding the Faith: The Process of Education in Catholic Schools in Australia, 1922–1965 (2001) 
 O'Farrell, Patrick. The Irish in Australia: 1798 to the Present Day (3rd ed. Cork University Press, 2001)

 Protestants 
 Brauer, Alfred. Under the Southern Cross: History of the Evangelical Lutheran Church of Australia (Lutheran Publishing House, 1985)
 Ellis, Julie-Ann. "'Cross-Firing over the Gulf': The Rift between Methodism and the Labour Movement in South Australia in the 1890s" Labour History (1993): 89–102. in JSTOR
 Hardgrave, Donald W. For Such a Time: A History of the Wesleyan Methodist Church of Australia (1988) 
 Harrison, John.  Baptism of Fire: The first ten years of the Uniting Church in Australia (1986)
 Hunt, Arnold Dudley. This Side of Heaven: A History of Methodism in South Australia'' (Lutheran Publishing House, 1985)

External links
Australian Standard Classification of Religious Groups (ASCRG), 1266.0, 1996
1996 Census Dictionary – Religion category
2001 Census Dictionary – Religion category
Year Book Australia, 2006. Religious Affiliation section
Australia in USA Department of State International Religious Freedom Report
  (History of Religion in Sydney) [CC-By-SA]

 
Demographics of Australia
Religion in the British Empire